John Hunt is a Welsh curler. He was a longtime skip of the Welsh national men's curling team in the 1980s and 1990s.

Teams

References

External links

Living people

Welsh male curlers
Year of birth missing (living people)
Place of birth missing (living people)